Stoneage is a compilation album by Finnish thrash metal band Stone that was originally released in 1998. It was rereleased under the title Stoneage 2.0 in 2008 and included the bonus track "Symptom of the Universe", a Black Sabbath cover.

Track listing 
All songs written by Stone, except for "Symptom of the Universe" by Geezer Butler, Tony Iommi, Ozzy Osbourne and Bill Ward.

Band members 
 Janne Joutsenniemi – bass, vocals
 Jiri Jalkanen – guitar (1985–1990)
 Nirri Niiranen – guitar (1990–1992)
 Roope Latvala – guitar
 Pekka Kasari – drums

References 

1998 compilation albums
2008 compilation albums
Thrash metal compilation albums
Stone (band) albums